Javier "Javi" Flores Santacruz (born 9 February 1986) is a Spanish footballer who plays for Córdoba CF as an attacking midfielder.

He started and finished his professional career with Córdoba, amassing Segunda División totals of 123 games and five goals over six seasons for that club and Elche. He appeared once in La Liga with the latter.

Club career
Born in Córdoba, Andalusia, Flores spent his entire youth career with Córdoba CF, and made his senior debut with their reserves in the 2004–05 season. He was promoted to the main squad the following year, and achieved promotion to the Segunda División in 2007.

Flores missed most of the 2007–08 campaign due to injury, and only played his first match as a professional on 16 March 2008, coming on as a late substitute in a 1–1 away draw against UD Salamanca. He was regularly used subsequently, being released in July 2011.

On 1 September 2011, Flores joined Segunda División B team Getafe CF B. After scoring a career-best ten goals in his only season, he signed with Elche CF of the second division.

On 5 August 2012, during a friendly with AD Alcorcón, Flores suffered a knee injury which kept him sidelined until April of the following year. He made his La Liga debut on the last day of 2013–14, featuring 73 minutes in the 3–1 away loss to Sevilla FC.

On 4 June 2014, Flores terminated his contract with the Valencians and moved to third-tier club Real Murcia on 2 September. He returned to Elche in 2017, after a two-year spell at Hércules CF in the same league.

Flores returned to the Estadio Nuevo Arcángel in the summer of 2019, after the team had just been relegated to division three.

References

External links

1986 births
Living people
Footballers from Córdoba, Spain
Spanish footballers
Association football midfielders
La Liga players
Segunda División players
Segunda División B players
Primera Federación players
Segunda Federación players
Divisiones Regionales de Fútbol players
Córdoba CF B players
Córdoba CF players
Getafe CF B players
Elche CF players
Real Murcia players
Hércules CF players